Wełna may refer to:

Wełna (river), a river in west-central Poland
Wełna, Greater Poland Voivodeship, a village in west-central Poland
Wełna, Kuyavian-Pomeranian Voivodeship, a village in central Poland